Ronda Narappa Reddy (born 29 August 1922) was an Indian politician. He was a Member of Parliament, representing Ongole in the Lok Sabha, the lower house of India's Parliament, as a member of the Indian National Congress.

References

External links
Official biographical sketch in Parliament of India website

Lok Sabha members from Andhra Pradesh
Indian National Congress politicians
India MPs 1957–1962
1922 births
Possibly living people
Indian National Congress politicians from Andhra Pradesh